"Evil Woman" is a song written by lead vocalist Jeff Lynne and recorded by Electric Light Orchestra (ELO). It was first released on the band's fifth album, 1975's Face the Music.

Background
When released as a single in late 1975, the song became the band's first worldwide hit. According to Lynne, this song was the quickest he had ever written, in thirty minutes, originally as 'filler' for the group's Face the Music album. The song placed in the top 10 on both sides of the Atlantic in early 1976. The song became a hit again in the UK in 1978 when it featured on The ELO EP. The lyric "There's a hole in my head where the rain comes in" in the song is a tribute to The Beatles' song "Fixing a Hole".

Reception
Billboard praised the use of the title lyrics as a hook. Cash Box noted the 20th-century influences and "commercial qualities" of the song, stating "from the classic hookline — a recurring four notes from 'Anchors Aweigh,' through an electronic schism from a dramatic TV serial two-thirds of the way through." Record World said that the song "puts rock within a classical frame and shows one of the few bands capable of a viable combination of experimentation with commerciality."

Ultimate Classic Rock critic Michael Gallucci rated it ELO's 3rd best song, saying that it has "old-school strings and new-school keyboards...backing a funky dance-floor beat that drives the song all the way to pop glory."

Chart performance

Weekly charts

Year-end charts

Certifications

Jeff Lynne version
Jeff Lynne re-recorded the song in his own home studio. It was released in a compilation album, Mr. Blue Sky: The Very Best of Electric Light Orchestra, with other re-recorded ELO songs, under the ELO name.

Cover versions
A cover version of the song was performed by Oh Mercy on Triple J's Like a Version segment in April 2011.

References

External links
In-depth Song Analysis at the Jeff Lynne Song Database (Jefflynnesongs.com)

1975 songs
1975 singles
1976 singles
Electric Light Orchestra songs
Jet Records singles
Song recordings produced by Jeff Lynne
Songs written by Jeff Lynne
United Artists Records singles